USS Sunbeam III (SP-251) was a United States Navy patrol vessel in commission from 1917 to 1919. The prefix designator means Section Patrol Craft.

Sunbeam III was built as a civilian motorboat of the same name in 1917 by the Charles L. Seabury Company and the Gas Engine and Power Company at Morris Heights in the Bronx, New York. Her owner, Mr. R. B. Roosevelt of New York City, loaned her to the U.S. Navy under a free lease agreement for World War I service as a patrol vessel. She was delivered to the Navy on 16 June 1917 and commissioned as USS Sunbeam III (SP-251) on 18 July 1917.

Sunbeam III was assigned to section patrol duty to protect antisubmarine nets in the New York Harbor area for the remainder of World War I.

Sunbeam III was stricken from the Navy List on 21 January 1919 and returned to Roosevelt.

This craft appears to be the same Sunbeam which was sold to a new owner in 1923, and through navigation error, found itself stranded in the Niagara River.

See also
Niagara Scow

Notes

References

Department of the Navy: Navy History and Heritage Command: Online Library of Selected Images: U.S. Navy Ships: USS Sunbeam III (SP-251), 1917-1918
NavSource Online: Section Patrol Craft Photo Archive: Sunbeam III (SP 251)

Patrol vessels of the United States Navy
World War I patrol vessels of the United States
Ships built in Morris Heights, Bronx
1917 ships